Shue Ming-shu (born 15 June 1940) is a former Taiwanese cyclist. He competed at the 1964 and 1968 Summer Olympics.

References

1940 births
Living people
Taiwanese male cyclists
Olympic cyclists of Taiwan
Cyclists at the 1964 Summer Olympics
Cyclists at the 1968 Summer Olympics